R136b is a Wolf–Rayet star in the R136 cluster in the Large Magellanic Cloud.  It is one of the most massive and most luminous stars known. It is found in the dense R136 open cluster at the centre of NGC 2070 in the Tarantula Nebula.

R136b has the spectral type of Wolf–Rayet star, with strong emission lines.  Although it shows enhanced helium and nitrogen at its surface, it is still a very young star, still burning hydrogen in its core via the CNO cycle, and still effectively a main sequence object.

References

Stars in the Large Magellanic Cloud
Extragalactic stars
Tarantula Nebula
Wolf–Rayet stars
?
Dorado (constellation)
Large Magellanic Cloud